The following is a summary of Down county football team's 2010 season.

Kits

Squad

Competitions

Dr McKenna Cup

Results

Table

Rounds

Matches and reports

National Football League Division 2

Results

Table

Matches and reports

Final

Ulster Senior Football Championship

Rounds

Matches and reports

All-Ireland Senior Football Championship

Qualifiers

Rounds

Matches and reports

References

Down
Gaelic
Down county football team seasons

es:All-Ireland Football Championship 2010
fr:Championnat d'Irlande de football gaélique 2010